Kamenka may refer to:

People
Eugene Kamenka, Australian philosopher, socialist

Places
Kamenka Urban Settlement, a municipal formation which the town of district significance of Kamenka in Kamensky District of Penza Oblast, Russia is incorporated as
Kamenka, Russia, several inhabited localities in Russia
Kamenka, an alternative name of the town of Taskala, Kazakhstan
Camenca, capital of the Administrative Region of Camenca of Transnistria
Kamianka (disambiguation) (Kamenka), several inhabited localities in Ukraine

Rivers
Kamenka (Ob), a minor tributary of the Ob in Novosibirsk Oblast
Kamenka (Saint Petersburg), a river in Lakhta-Olgino Municipal Okrug near Saint Petersburg
Kamenka (Iset), a tributary of the Iset in Sverdlovsk Oblast, Russia
Kamenka (Nerl), a tributary of the Nerl in Vladimir Oblast, Russia

Other
Kamenka (island), an island in Lake Peipsi-Pihkva (between Estonia and Russia)
5385 Kamenka, an asteroid discovered by Lyudmila Chernykh, Soviet astronomer

See also
Kamensky (disambiguation)
Kamensk, several inhabited localities in Russia
Kamienka (disambiguation)
Kamionka (disambiguation)